Om Yun-chol or Um Yoon-chul (or  ; born 18 November 1991) is a North Korean weightlifter, Olympic Champion, and five time World Champion competing in the 56 kg category until 2018 and 55 kg starting in 2018 after the International Weightlifting Federation reorganized the categories. Om represents the Amnokgang Sports Team.

He is also the fourth man to lift over 3 times bodyweight in the clean & jerk multiple times after succeeding in breaking the world record clean and jerk of 169 kg in the −56 kg weight class during the Asian Interclub Championships, and has accomplished this feat 3 more times since the Asian Interclub Championships, at the 2014 Asian Games, 2015 World Weightlifting Championships, and the 2016 Summer Olympics.

He was also the sixth man to lift at least triple his bodyweight in the clean & jerk in international competition, having done so seven times; the others are Naim Süleymanoğlu, Stefan Topurov, Long Qingquan, Halil Mutlu, and Neno Terziyski.

He has set six senior world records throughout his career, five in the clean & jerk and one in the total.

Career

Olympics
He won the gold medal at the 2012 Summer Olympics at the men's 56 kg event, setting an Olympic Record in the clean and jerk with 168 kg, all while competing in the B session. He became only the fifth man to ever clean and jerk three times his own body weight.

At the men's 56 kg weightlifting event at the 2016 Summer Olympics in Rio de Janeiro, Om was a favorite to renew his gold from London. After breaking his own Olympic record with a lift of 169 kg, Om was surpassed by Long Qingquan and had to settle for the silver medal.

World Championships
He won his first World Championships in 2013, one year removed from becoming Olympic Champion, by beating Long Qingquan by 2 kg.

In 2014 he defended his title as World Champion by lifting 296 kg at the 2014 World Weightlifting Championships. His total was tied with second place Thạch Kim Tuấn but he won by virtue of a lighter body weight (55.71 vs. 55.75).

Following his World Championship win in 2014 he was the heavy favorite to win his third World championship in a row. He ended up winning the gold medal at the 2015 World Weightlifting Championships in spectacular fashion, after trailing Wu Jingbiao by 8 kg in the snatch (during which he set a new world record snatch of 168 kg) Om Yun-chol outlifted Wu Jingbiao by 8 kg in the clean and jerk setting a new world record clean and jerk of 171 kg. Their totals of 302 kg were tied, but yet again Om Yun-chol won by virtue of a lighter body weight.

He did not compete in the 2017 World Weightlifting Championships due to the North Korean team issuing a boycott of the Championships.

In 2018 the International Weightlifting Federation reorganized the categories and he competed in the newly created 55 kg, he won his fourth World Championships by a margin of 24 kg over the second-place finisher, while winning gold medals in all lifts. During the clean and jerk portion of the competition he set a new world record of 162 kg.

Asian Games
At the 2014 Asian Games he won the gold medal in the 56 kg, in the clean and jerk portion he set a new world record lift of 170 kg. His total of 298 kg was an Asian Record at the time of competition.

At the next Asian Games in 2018 he was the favorite to win another gold medal at the Games. After finishing in second place after the snatch portion of the competition, 1 kg behind Thạch Kim Tuấn, he outlifted him by 8 kg in the clean and jerk portion of the competition securing his second Asian Games gold medal.

Major results

CWR: Current world record
WR: World record
UR: Universiade record

References

External links

1991 births
Living people
North Korean male weightlifters
Olympic weightlifters of North Korea
Weightlifters at the 2012 Summer Olympics
Weightlifters at the 2016 Summer Olympics
Olympic gold medalists for North Korea
Olympic silver medalists for North Korea
Olympic medalists in weightlifting
People from North Hamgyong
World record holders in Olympic weightlifting
Medalists at the 2012 Summer Olympics
Medalists at the 2016 Summer Olympics
Weightlifters at the 2014 Asian Games
Weightlifters at the 2018 Asian Games
Asian Games medalists in weightlifting
World Weightlifting Championships medalists
Asian Games gold medalists for North Korea
Medalists at the 2014 Asian Games
Medalists at the 2018 Asian Games
Universiade medalists in weightlifting
Universiade gold medalists for North Korea
21st-century North Korean people